Violet Helen Evangeline Teague (21 February 1872 – 30 September 1951) was an Australian artist, noted for her painting and printmaking.

Early life and training
The only daughter of Melbourne homeopath James Teague and his wife Eliza Jane Miller, Teague was born on 21 February 1872 in Melbourne. Her mother died while she was an infant, and she was raised by her father and his second wife, Sybella, along with Sybella's two children. Teague was taught by a governess at home, and her education included French and the classics. She completed college at the Presbyterian Ladies' College, Melbourne.

Teague travelled with her family in Europe as a young woman. She toured widely, and visited galleries in Germany, France, Belgium the Netherlands and England. In 1901, she recalled visiting Spanish galleries during her childhood, and commented "never shall I forget the Velazquez, with their beautiful horses and exquisite colouring, or the lovely Raphaels". She studied in the Brussels studio of Ernest Blanc-Garin and with Sir Hubert von Herkomer in England.

Career
Teague exhibited regularly at the Paris Salons, including with a portrait of a Colonel Rede in 1897 at the Société des Artistes Français.

In 1902 she was appointed to the council of the Victorian Artists Society which published her poem 'A Cloud Fantasy in its journal.

She was "the first Australian to demonstrate a sustained interest in, and an understanding of Japanese woodblock printmaking". Printing from woodblock had a long history in Japan. She collaborated in woodcuts with her friend Geraldine Rede, publishing Night Fall in the Ti-Tree together from her Collins Street studio in 1905. The 32 page Haiku-style text tells the story of the simple life of bushland rabbits with 16 coloured woodblock illustrations. This collaborative little book is the first example of coloured woodblock printing in Australia, and also the first Australian artists' book.

Her painting Boy with a Palette won a silver prize from the Old Salon, Paris when exhibited in 1920, and was later hung at the Royal Academy of Arts, London.

Following the 1920 Paris Salon, Australian artist Rupert Bunny wrote to Teague, and observed that The Boy with the Pallette was one of the best works in that year's exhibition at the Old Salon.

One of the most unusual aspects of Teague's oeuvre, one that lacks almost any referents in Australian art, was the creation of altar paintings and banners for Protestant churches. The first was a 1910 commission (now in the Hamilton art gallery) for a church in Wannon, Victoria, where her brother worshipped. The frame for the work was designed by her friend, artist Jessie Traill. In 1921, Teague exhibited an altar piece (now at St. Paul's Cathedral, Melbourne) for a new church at Kinglake, Victoria, built as a memorial to soldiers who died in World War I. Inscriptions to accompany the picture were again prepared by Traill, and placed on the base of the work. The painting was Teague's most prominent work at a solo exhibition held at the Melbourne Athenaeum in 1921.

In 1933 Teague and her sister Una travelled across the outback by car to visit the Hermannsburg Mission. The Mission had recently suffered a drought resulting in the deaths of a third of the Aboriginal population. The sisters helped raise more than £2,000 towards a pipeline to help transport water to the Mission. She also met famed Aboriginal artist Albert Namatjira, who named one of his children after her.

 Exhibitions 
Victorian Artists' Society, Winter Exhibition [1905] Victorian Artists Society Galleries (14 July 1905 - 19 August 1905)

Eight Federal Art Exhibition, Society of Artists' Royal South Australian Society of Arts Gallery (10 November 1905 - 2 December 1905)

Victorian Artists' Society, Annual Exhibition [1906] Victorian Artists Society Galleries (1 January 1906 - 1906)

First Australian Exhibition of Women's Work [1907] Multiple venues (23 October 1907 - 30 November 1907)

[Exhibition] Bradley's Rooms (1 September 1908)

The Arts and Crafts Society of Victoria [1908] Guild Hall (2 December 1908 - 12 December 1908)

Victorian Artists' Society, Winter Exhibition [1909] Victorian Artists Society Galleries (1 July 1909)

Victorian Artists' Society, Annual Exhibition [1911] Victorian Artists Society Galleries (1911)

Victorian Artists' Society, Annual Exhibition [1912] Victorian Artists Society Galleries (12 July 1912 - 10 August 1912)

Victorian Artists' Society, Annual Exhibition [1914] Victorian Artists Society Galleries (29 April 1914 - 23 May 1914)

Australian Artists' War Fund exhibition [1915] Vickery's Chambers

Arts and Crafts Society Exhibition Federal Court House (12 November 1919 - 26 November 1919)

Representative collection of Australian art Margaret Maclean's Gallery (1 November 1940 - 1 December 1940)

 Published works 
Birds of the sunny south, with Australian flowers / produced entirely by Australians (V. Teague, G. Rede, I. Gregory, A. Ashley) [Melbourne] 1915(?) : Pater's Printery

Night fall in the ti-tree / woodcuts by Geraldine Rede and Violet Teague, [Melbourne] 1905 : Sign of the Rabbit

Legacy
Teague has been reckoned among the best portraitists Australia has produced. Teague has also been identified as one of Australia's first female art critics.

Teague Street in the Canberra suburb of Cook is named in her honour.

 Further reading 
Papers of Violet Teague [1890-2000] [manuscript], State Library Victoria

Violet Teague [Australian art and artists file], State Library Victoria

ReferencesNotesBibliography'

External links
 

1872 births
1951 deaths
Australian women painters
Australian painters
Artists from Melbourne
Australian art critics
Australian women art critics
20th-century Australian women artists
20th-century Australian artists
19th-century Australian women artists
People educated at the Presbyterian Ladies' College, Melbourne
National Gallery of Victoria Art School alumni